Michael McEachern McDowell (June 1, 1950 – December 27, 1999) was an American novelist and screenwriter described by author Stephen King as "the finest writer of paperback originals in America today". His best-known work is the screenplay for the Tim Burton film Beetlejuice.

Personal life

McDowell was born in 1950 in Enterprise, Alabama, and graduated from T.R. Miller High in Brewton, Alabama. He received a B.A. and an M.A. from Harvard College, and a Ph.D in English from Brandeis University in 1978, based on a dissertation entitled "American Attitudes Toward Death, 1825–1865".

McDowell lived in Medford, Massachusetts, and maintained a residence in Hollywood with his sister Ann and the filmmaker Peter Lake. He also had one brother, James. McDowell's partner was theatre historian and director Laurence Senelick, whom he met in 1969 when McDowell was a cast member of the Senelick-directed play, Bartholomew Fair. McDowell and Senelick remained together for thirty years until McDowell's death.

McDowell specialized in collecting death memorabilia. His extensive and diverse collection, which reportedly filled over seventy-six boxes, included items such as death pins, photographs and plaques from infant caskets. After his death, the collection was acquired by Chicago's Northwestern University, where it went on display in 2013.

McDowell was diagnosed with AIDS in 1994. After his diagnosis, McDowell taught screenwriting at Boston University and Tufts University while continuing to write commissioned screenplays. One of his final projects, upon which he was working at the time of his death, was a sequel to Beetlejuice. His final, unfinished novel Candles Burning was completed by novelist Tabitha King and published in 2006.

McDowell died on December 27, 1999, in Boston, Massachusetts, from an AIDS-related illness at the age of 49.

Literary career

While arguably best known for his works of Southern Gothic horror, McDowell was an accomplished stylist who wrote several series with marked differences in tone, character, and subject matter. His period novels are praised for their intricate eye for historical research and accurate details, and range from Gilded Age New York City to wiregrass Alabama in the depths of the Great Depression.

McDowell collaborated with his close friend Dennis Schuetz in writing four mysteries starring Daniel Valentine and Clarisse Lovelace: Vermillion (1980), Cobalt (1982), Slate (1984), and Canary (1986). The four novels were published under the pseudonym Nathan Aldyne.

In the early 1980s, McDowell and Dennis Schuetz released two psychological thrillers, Blood Rubies (1982) and Wicked Stepmother (1983) under the pseudonym Axel Young. Both books were over-the-top parodies of Sidney Sheldon-type suspense novels.

In the mid-1980s, McDowell wrote the "Jack and Susan" mysteries for Ballantine Books, featuring characters reminiscent of the influential Thin Man films. The series included Jack and Susan in 1953 (1985), Jack and Susan in 1913 (1986)  and Jack and Susan in 1933 (1987).  The books  chronicled the adventures of an eternally youthful couple and their ever-changing dog. McDowell had contracted to do one for each decade of the century, but he bowed out of the contract after three.

His screen credits include Beetlejuice (1987), and collaborations on The Nightmare Before Christmas (1993) and Thinner (1996). McDowell also wrote the novelization of the film Clue in 1985. The film was based on the board game and featured three different endings; however, the novelization was based on the shooting script and includes an additional fourth ending that was cut from the film. He also contributed screenplays to a number of television horror anthologies, including Tales from the Darkside.

McDowell was one of seventeen contemporary British and American horror writers interviewed by Douglas E. Winter in his 1985 interview book Faces of Fear. Of his writing, McDowell says in this book: "I am a commercial writer and I'm proud of that. I am writing things to be put in the bookstore next month. I think it is a mistake to try to write for the ages." Stephen King described McDowell as "the finest writer of paperback originals in America today".

Bibliography
 The Amulet (1979), reissued in 2013 by Valancourt Books, with a new introduction by Poppy Z. Brite. When the citizens of Pine Cone, Alabama, begin to die in shocking and grisly ways, Sarah Howell suspects a strange piece of jewelry is the link between the deaths, and that her hateful, vindictive mother-in-law Jo is behind it all.
 Cold Moon Over Babylon (1980), reissued in 2015 by Valancourt Books, with a new introduction by Douglas E. Winter. A young girl's mysterious disappearance in quiet Babylon, Florida, awakens a horror in the Styx River that draws the Larkin, Redfield and Hale families into a supernatural web of murder and madness.
 Gilded Needles (1980), reissued in 2015 by Valancourt Books, with a new introduction by Christopher Fowler. When an enemy from her past unwittingly sets in motion the destruction of her family and livelihood, cunning criminal mastermind Lena Shanks, now with the power and resources to fight back, plots her revenge.
 The Elementals (1981), reissued in 2014 by Valancourt Books, with a new introduction by Michael Rowe. The Savage and McCray families seek out their Victorian summer houses in remote Beldame, Alabama, for what they hope will be a relaxing vacation on the Gulf Coast. But a third house, abandoned and slowly being consumed by sand, holds a horror that has plagued them for generations, and young India McCray has awakened it.
 Katie (1982), reissued in 2015 by Valancourt Books. A plea for help from her estranged grandfather puts young Philomena Drax in the dangerous path of the wicked John and Hannah Slape and their clairvoyant, homicidal daughter Katie.
 The Blackwater series (1983). A disastrous flood in Perdido, Alabama, leaves behind mysterious new arrival Elinor Dammert, who soon marries into the wealthy Caskey family. But Elinor shares a secret, supernatural link to the Blackwater River that determines both Perdido's livelihood and its fate. Over the next 50 years, Elinor's influence brings prosperity, animosity, death, and reconciliation to the Caskeys.
 "The Flood"
 "The Levee"
 "The House"
 "The War"
 "The Fortune"
 "Rain"
Books 1-3 and 4-6 of the Blackwater series were collected as two omnibus editions released in 1983 immediately after the original serialized publication. In 2014, the series was reissued by Tough Times Publishing as e-books of both the original individual volumes and as a single omnibus, Blackwater: The Complete Caskey Family Saga. In 2015, another hardcover publication of the full series, with illustrations by Patrick Loehr and an introduction by author Poppy Z. Brite, was released as a limited edition by Centipede Press. An omnibus edition was reissued in 2017 by Valancourt Books, with a new introduction by Nathan Ballingrud.
 Toplin (1985), reissued in 2017 by Valancourt Books. A fastidious and thoroughly insane young man finds his life veering toward madness and murder after a seemingly innocent event convinces him of a vast conspiracy to destroy his orderly world.
 Clue (1985) , movie novelization
 The Jack and Susan novels, a.k.a. the Wild Card series. All novels in this series were reprinted in 2013 by Felony & Mayhem Press. Jack and Susan are always 27 years old, always meeting for the first time, always acquiring the same white dog, and always falling in love. All that changes is the decade and the screwball mystery they solve together.
 Jack and Susan in 1953 (1985)
 Jack and Susan in 1913 (1986)
 Jack and Susan in 1933 (1987)
 Candles Burning (2006), completed by Tabitha King after McDowell's death. Calliope "Calley" Dakin, a child who hears the dead, finds herself forced to unravel the mystery of her father's grisly murder in order to free herself from the clutches of a conspiracy of women who want to use her powers for their own gain.

Short stories
 "Miss Mack" in Halloween Horrors (September 1986, Ed. Alan Ryan, Doubleday), reprinted in The Valancourt Book of Horror Stories, Vol. 1 (October 2016, Valancourt Books)
 "Halley's Passing" in The Year's Best Science Fiction: Fifth Annual Collection (May 1998, St. Martin's Press)

As Axel Young (with Dennis Schuetz)
 Blood Rubies (1982), reissued in 2017 by Valancourt Books. Separated as newborns by the fiery death of their mother, twins Katherine and Andrea each possess one of a pair of heirloom ruby earrings. Though unaware of each other's existence, a string of gruesome tragedies seems to conspire to lead the sisters back together.
 Wicked Stepmother (1983), reissued 2017 by Valancourt Books. Wicked and greedy Louise marries an elderly millionaire and then murders him, but to hold onto the fortune and get away with the crime, she must navigate—and possibly eliminate—his three suspicious children.

As Nathan Aldyne (with Dennis Schuetz)
 The Valentine and Lovelace detective novels, all reprinted in 2014 by Felony & Mayhem Press.
 Vermillion (1980): The murder of a luckless young hustler brings the unwanted attention of a bigoted politician to Boston's tight-knit gay community. Cool-headed bartender Daniel Valentine and his plucky, reckless best friend Clarisse Lovelace find themselves unwittingly involved in hunting the killer.
 Cobalt (1982): A leisurely summer getaway for Daniel and Clarisse is interrupted when the body of a handsome local playboy is discovered on the beach, and there's far too many people who wanted him dead.
 Slate (1984): Daniel and Clarisse have finally achieved their dream of opening their own gay bar. All goes well until a dead man turns up on the dance floor and Daniel has to clear his own name.
 Canary (1986): When an apparent serial killer starts dumping bodies near Valentine's bar, both Daniel and Clarisse fear the next victim might be Daniel himself.

As Preston Macadam
 Michael Sheriff, The Shield: African Assignment (1985)
 Michael Sheriff, The Shield: Arabian Assault (1985)
 Michael Sheriff, The Shield: Island Intrigue (1985)

As Mike McCray
 Several titles in the "Black Beret" series (1984–1987)

Screenwriting credits
 Alfred Hitchcock Presents (episode "The Jar")
 Amazing Stories (episode "Miscalculation")
 Beetlejuice (1988) (shared story and screenplay); nominated for a Saturn Award for Best Writing
 Tales from the Darkside (1984-1987) (eleven episodes)
 Tales from the Crypt (1989) (episode "Lover Come Hack to Me")
 Monsters (1989-1990) (episodes "La Strega" and "Far Below")
 Tales from the Darkside: The Movie (1990) (segments "Lot 249" and "Lover's Vow")
 The Nightmare Before Christmas (1993) (adaptation by)
 Thinner (1996) (screenplay by McDowell and Tom Holland, based on the 1984 novel by Stephen King)

Adaptations
 Beetlejuice (TV series based on the 1988 film)
 Cold Moon (based on the 1980 novel, Cold Moon Over Babylon)

References

External links
 
 
 Michael M. McDowell Collection  at the Browne Popular Culture Library, Bowling Green State University
 McDowell biography and selected bibliography by Valancourt Books
 McDowell site  by Valancourt publisher Ryan Cagle

Further reading
 
 

1950 births
1999 deaths
20th-century American novelists
American horror writers
American male novelists
American male screenwriters
Brandeis University alumni
Harvard University alumni
American gay writers
American LGBT novelists
People from Enterprise, Alabama
AIDS-related deaths in Massachusetts
American LGBT screenwriters
LGBT people from Alabama
Novelists from Alabama
20th-century American male writers
Weird fiction writers
20th-century American screenwriters